L'Apocalypse des animaux is a soundtrack album by Greek composer Vangelis. The album's music accompanied a documentary series about the animal kingdom directed by Frédéric Rossif that was first broadcast on French TV in 1970.

Track listing
All tracks composed and arranged by Vangelis.

"Apocalypse des animaux – Générique" – 1:26
"La Petite Fille de la mer" – 5:54
"Le Singe bleu" – 7:39
"La Mort du loup" – 3:03
"L'Ours musicien" – 1:03
"Création du monde" – 10:03
"La Mer recommencée" – 5:56

Overview
This album is one of Vangelis' earliest works, recorded whilst still a member of progressive rock band Aphrodite's Child. It also marks the first time that he collaborated with French director Frédéric Rossif on soundtracks relating to his TV documentary programmes.

Though the album itself was released in 1973, the music was recorded in 1970. In opposition to the way he later recorded soundtrack music – watching the filmed material, then composing to it – in this instance he simply recorded a suite of generic tunes (based on the wildlife theme of the project, but not having access to it) and left it to the film editors to splice-in whatever they needed.

The documentary contains much more music than is available on the album, a common theme with Vangelis soundtracks.

The music belongs to a period in which Vangelis was very prolific and willing to experiment with technology and styles. Not only was he still part of a band and collaborating with a variety of artists, but he had also created a soundtrack to the film Sex Power by Henry Chapier and participated in recording sessions with some of the most talented jazz and rock musicians in London at the time, the results of which were later released without Vangelis's authorization as the albums Hypothesis and The Dragon.

Personnel
Vangelis – keyboards
Didier Pitois – sound engineer
Tony Kent – photography

Notes
 Jon Anderson, lead vocalist of progressive rock group Yes, was so intrigued by the album that he decided to visit Vangelis, which began their fruitful working relationship.
 The album is called "El Apocalipsis de los Animales" in South America.
 Some LP pressings show "Création du Monde" as having a track-time of 17:45, which is incorrect.
 La Petite Fille de la mer appeared on the soundtrack of Stranger than Fiction, and although it was heard in episodes of the Japanese drama Watashitachi no Kyokasho ("Our Textbook"), the song was not included on its soundtrack.
 The track La Petite Fille de la mer features prominently in Slava Polunin's world-famous stage production Slava's Snowshow.
 "Creation Du Monde" was used extensively by the band Yes as pre show music prior to the band appearing onstage during their "Relayer" tour.
 "Creation Du Monde" is featured on the soundtrack to Cosmos: A Personal Voyage, appearing most prominently in a sequence in the fourth episode ("Heaven and Hell") where host Carl Sagan talks about the formation of impact craters.

The TV documentary
The series consisted of six episodes, each lasting 50 minutes:
  (From Bee to Gorilla)
  (Animals and Humans)
  (Elephant's Memory)
  (Chasing the Hunter)
  (Fear of the Wolf)
  (The Child and the Sea)

Album versions
 Polydor, LP, 2393-058
 Polydor, LP, MPF 1313 (Japan)
 Polydor, CD, 831503-2
 Telewestel, CD, EUCD0004 (Hungary)
 Polydor, CD, P22P20303 (Japan)
 Polydor, cassette, 185083 (Chile). Entitled  and credited to Vangelis Papathanassiou. Track list in Spanish and French.

References

External links
 'Vangelis Movements' album entry
 'Vangelis Movements' documentary entry
 'Vangelis Collector' album entry
 'Vangelis Collector' documentary entry
 'Elsewhere' entry

Documentary film soundtracks
Polydor Records soundtracks
1973 soundtrack albums
Vangelis soundtracks
Instrumental soundtracks